Mikko Huhtala (born 30 March 1952 in Lapua) is a Finnish retired Greco-Roman style wrestler.

References

External links
 

1952 births
Living people
Olympic bronze medalists for Finland
Olympic wrestlers of Finland
Wrestlers at the 1976 Summer Olympics
Wrestlers at the 1980 Summer Olympics
Finnish male sport wrestlers
Olympic medalists in wrestling
World Wrestling Championships medalists
Medalists at the 1980 Summer Olympics
European Wrestling Championships medalists
People from Lapua
Sportspeople from South Ostrobothnia
20th-century Finnish people
21st-century Finnish people